The  was a 22.3 km Japanese freight railway line in Akita Prefecture, Japan, operated by . The line operated between Ōdate Station in Ōdate and Kosaka Station in Kosaka. Opened in 1908, passenger services operated until 1994, but freight operations were suspended from April 2008, and the line closed in 2009.

Rolling stock
In later years, the line's locomotive fleet consisted of three Class DD10 centre-cab diesel locomotives (numbered DD11 to DD13) built in 1962, three Class DD130 centre-cab diesel locomotives (numbered DD131 to DD133) built between 1967 and 1968, and one Class DD13 centre-cab diesel locomotive built in 1967 and purchased from the former Katakami Railway in 1988.

Freight trains were hauled by pairs of DD130 diesel locomotives, with triple-heading used on up trains over the steeply-graded section between Kosaka and Shigenai.

History

From 1928, part of the line was electrified using surplus power from the copper mine.

In 1951, the Hanaoka Line was converted to  gauge, and the Kosaka Line was also regauged to 1,067 mm from 1 October 1962, from which time diesel haulage commenced and passenger and freight services were operated separately.

The Hanaoka Line closed as of 1 April 1985. From 1989, the operating company was renamed . Passenger services on the Kosaka Line also ended on 30 September 1994.

Operations on the line were suspended from April 2008 following the discontinuation of sulphuric acid transportation by rail, and the line was formally closed from 1 April 2009.

Later events
On 2 November 2014, the electronics manufacturer Panasonic ran a specially built battery-powered train over a distance of 8.5 km on the line to promote its "Evolta" range of batteries. The lightweight car built of cardboard in conjunction with Akita Prefectural University was powered by 99 D size batteries, and carried 10 elementary school children at a speed of approximately 6 km/h.

See also
 List of railway companies in Japan
 List of railway lines in Japan

References

Railway lines in Japan
Rail transport in Akita Prefecture
Kosaka, Akita
Railway lines opened in 1908
Railway lines closed in 2009
1067 mm gauge railways in Japan
1908 establishments in Japan